Bratyajon is a Bengali theatre group of Kolkata, West Bengal, India.

History 
The director of the group Bratyajon is Bratya Basu. The first play staged by Bratyojon was Ruddhasangeet (2009). In August 2012, the opened 4 franchisees in West Bengal. In November 2013, Bratyajan opened 7 franchisees.

Productions 
 Ruddhasangeet (2009)
 Byomkesh
Sinemar Moto(2013)

References

External links 
 

Theatre companies in India
Bengali theatre groups
Organizations with year of establishment missing